John of Gischala (70) was a leader of the first Jewish revolt against the Romans.

History
During the Jewish war with Rome, John of Gischala, son of Levi, vied with Josephus over the control of Galilee and amassed a large band of supporters from Gischala (Hebrew:Gush Halav) and Gabara, including the support of the Sanhedrin in Jerusalem.

As part of the Roman campaign to put down the revolt in Judea, Titus marched on Gush Halav, called Giscala by the Romans. Giscala was the last town in Galilee not yet conquered. Outside the walls of the city, he called on them to surrender. John prevailed upon Titus not to enter the city that day, as it was Sabbath, "not so much out of regard to the seventh day as to his own preservation." John fled to Jerusalem that night, and "Titus was greatly displeased that he had not been able to bring this John, who had deluded him, to punishment."

When John entered Jerusalem, it was in an uproar, and the people clamoured for news.

Soon after his arrival in Jerusalem, he played an instrumental part in the outcome of the Zealot Temple Siege, handing the city over to control of the Zealots. He attempted to set himself up as ruler of Jerusalem but was challenged in April 69 by Simon Bar Giora. They were both in turn challenged by a third faction led by Eleazar ben Simon. John and the Zealots fought in the civil war with these two factions  until he was finally captured by Titus during the Siege of Jerusalem. He was sentenced to life imprisonment, taken to Rome and paraded through the streets in chains.

Legacy
He was the subject of the Italian drama Giovanni di Giscala (1754) by Alfonso Varano. The work inspired the Italian opera Giovanni di Giscala (1855) by Giovanni Gaetano Rossi and Alfonso Cavagnar.

References

External links
JOHN OF GISCALA (Johanan ben Levi), Jewish Encyclopedia; Article

Jews and Judaism in the Roman Empire
1st-century Jews
Jewish rebels
Siege of Jerusalem (70 CE)